In the Shadows is a 2001 American thriller film written and directed by Ric Roman Waugh and starring Matthew Modine, James Caan, Joey Lauren Adams, Lillo Brancato and Cuba Gooding Jr. It was released in the United States on June 22, 2001. In the film, Modine plays hit man Eric O'Bryne, who is sent to kill veteran Hollywood stuntman Lance Huston (Caan), falls in love with the target's daughter (Adams) and then decides to become a stuntman himself.

Plot
Hit man Eric O'Byrne (Matthew Modine) has orders from the mob: kill Hollywood stunt coordinator Lance Huston (James Caan). In order to make the hit, Eric travels to Miami and ingratiates himself into Lance's world as a stuntman. He also slips into a dangerous romance with Lance's daughter, Clarissa (Joey Lauren Adams). As time draws near to O'Byrne deadly act, he starts to grow a conscience, a development that could be his greatest asset or his fatal weakness.

Reception 
DVD Talk rated the film favorably, writing that "Ric Roman Waugh is competent behind the camera for his directorial debut, and the film benefits from a strong cast." TV Guide was more negative, as they felt that "This overly complicated wise-guy adventure makes good use of the stunt work background. But it falters in the areas of characterization, plot resolution and general narrative credibility."

References

External links
 
 
 

2001 crime thriller films
2001 films
American crime thriller films
American mystery films
2000s English-language films
Films about stunt performers
Films directed by Ric Roman Waugh
Films set in Miami
Films set in New York City
Films shot in Miami
2000s American films